The 1973–74 Scottish Second Division was won by Airdrieonians who, along with second placed Kilmarnock, were promoted to the First Division. Brechin City finished bottom.

Table

References

Scottish Football Archive

Scottish Division Two seasons
2
Scot